Niiyama (written: 新山) mean New mountain is a Japanese surname. Notable people with the surname include:

, Japanese actress and gravure idol
, Japanese voice actress
, Japanese singer and songwriter

Japanese-language surnames